Communauté d'agglomération du Pays de Laon is the communauté d'agglomération, an intercommunal structure, centred on the town of Laon. It is located in the Aisne department, in the Hauts-de-France region, northern France. Created in 2014, its seat is in Aulnois-sous-Laon. Its area is 315.4 km2. Its population was 42,147 in 2019, of which 24,304 in Laon proper.

Composition
The communauté d'agglomération consists of the following 38 communes:

Arrancy
Athies-sous-Laon
Aulnois-sous-Laon
Besny-et-Loizy
Bièvres
Bruyères-et-Montbérault
Bucy-lès-Cerny
Cerny-en-Laonnois
Cerny-lès-Bucy
Cessières-Suzy
Chambry
Chamouille
Chérêt
Chivy-lès-Étouvelles
Clacy-et-Thierret
Colligis-Crandelain
Crépy
Eppes
Étouvelles
Festieux
Laniscourt
Laon
Laval-en-Laonnois
Lierval
Martigny-Courpierre
Molinchart
Mons-en-Laonnois
Montchâlons
Monthenault
Nouvion-le-Vineux
Orgeval
Parfondru
Presles-et-Thierny
Samoussy
Vaucelles-et-Beffecourt
Veslud
Vivaise
Vorges

References

Laon
Laon